The Galkan Winter Sports Centre is a hockey indoor arena in Ashgabat, Turkmenistan. It was built on the territory of the Institute of the Ministry of Internal Affairs of Turkmenistan in 2014 and holds 630 spectators. It was built by a Turkmen company, Aga Gurlyşyk.

References

2014 establishments in Turkmenistan
Ice hockey in Turkmenistan
Indoor ice hockey venues
Sports venues completed in 2014
Sports venues in Ashgabat